Phanomorpha dapsilis is a moth of the family Crambidae described by Alfred Jefferis Turner in 1908. It is known from Australia, including the Australian Capital Territory.

The wingspan is about 20 mm. Adults are white with complex brown pattern on each forewing. The hindwings are plain brown.

References

Moths described in 1908
Heliothelini